The Miller Bridge is a historic structure, originally located northeast of Winterset, Iowa, United States. The Madison County Board of Supervisors contracted with King and Twiss of Des Moines to supply the wrought iron Pratt pony truss. Local contractors H.P. Jones and G.K. Foster built the iron tube substructure and erected the truss manufactured by the King Iron Bridge & Manufacturing Company of Cleveland. The total cost of the project was $2,197.55. The bridge was listed on the National Register of Historic Places in 1998. The span was moved in 2008.

References

Bridges completed in 1884
Bridges in Madison County, Iowa
National Register of Historic Places in Madison County, Iowa
Road bridges on the National Register of Historic Places in Iowa
Truss bridges in Iowa
Wrought iron bridges in the United States
Pratt truss bridges in the United States